Gerard "Gerry" Stembridge (born 1958, County Limerick, Ireland) is an Irish writer, director and actor. He was educated at CBS Sexton Street in Limerick and later at Castleknock College. While attending University College Dublin, he was auditor of the Literary and Historical Society. He taught English and drama at Mount Temple Comprehensive School in Clontarf.

Radio
He reached significant prominence in Ireland when he co-created the satirical comedy radio programme Scrap Saturday with Dermot Morgan. It became one of the most popular programmes on RTÉ Radio.

Film career
Stembridge wrote the screenplay for Ordinary Decent Criminal (which starred Kevin Spacey and Linda Fiorentino). He co-wrote Nora, a film about James Joyce and Nora Barnacle which starred Ewan McGregor and Susan Lynch. He has directed such films as Guiltrip, Black Day at Black Rock, Alarm and About Adam.

Playwright
A selection of his plays include 
1992
Betrayals
Ceaucescu's Ear (Teatru Míc in Bucharest)
Daniel's Hands (City Arts Centre, Dublin)
Denis and Rose (Civic Theatre, Dublin)
The Gay Detective (Project Arts Centre, Dublin)
Love Child
Melting Penguins
That Was Then (Abbey Theatre, Dublin).
The Leaving

Novels
Stembridge's latest novel The Effect of Her was published in 2013. He is also the author of three earlier novels: Unspoken (Old Street Press), Counting Down and According to Luke (both Penguin Ireland).

See also
Auditors of the Literary and Historical Society (University College Dublin)

References

External links

1958 births
Date of birth missing (living people)
Writers from Limerick (city)
People educated at Castleknock College
Auditors of the Literary and Historical Society (University College Dublin)
Alumni of University College Dublin
Irish schoolteachers
Mount Temple Comprehensive School
Mass media people from Limerick (city)
Irish satirists
Irish film directors
Living people